Vangueria agrestis is a species of flowering plant in the family Rubiaceae. It is found from West Tropical Africa to Sudan.

External links 
 World Checklist of Rubiaceae

agrestis
Flora of Sudan